Kleinlobming is a village and former municipality in the Bezirk Murtal in Styria, Austria. Since the 2015 Styria municipal structural reform, it is part of the municipality Großlobming.

References

Cities and towns in Murtal District